Buxa Road is the name of the railway station under Northeast Frontier Railway Zone under Indian Railways in Alipurduar district, West Bengal.  It is located at the easternmost end of Dooars valley  near the Buxa Tiger Reserve, the second largest tiger reserve in West Bengal.

Railway stations in Alipurduar district
Alipurduar railway division